The University of the Philippines School of Economics is a degree-granting unit of the University of the Philippines Diliman (U.P.), where it occupies the buildings of the Philippine Center for Economic Development (PCED). The school offers two Bachelor of Science degrees (B.S. Economics and B.S. Business Economics), two master's degrees (Master in Development Economics and M.A. in Economics) and the Ph.D. in economics.

Established in 1965, the School of Economics was chosen as the first and only CHED Center for Excellence in Economics in the Philippines in 1999. Its academic programs enjoy a high national and international reputation, with a regular faculty consisting entirely of Ph.D.-holders. In April 2017, the School was among the top 5% (rank 175 among 7,408) of economics departments in the world based on the strength of its graduate students, as ranked by RePEc.

The faculty has included three National Scientists, one Academician, and several Outstanding Young Scientists, all as recognized by the National Academy of Science and Technology of the Philippines.

Faculty research is particularly strong in the areas of health economics, public economics, and development economics. In collaboration with the Philippine Economic Society, the school publishes the Philippine Review of Economics, the journal of the economics profession in the country.

Graduates of the School of Economics have distinguished themselves in the fields of economics, business, law, education, and politics. Among notable alumni of the School, or the economics department preceding it, are deans of the School and officers of the university, leaders of the Philippines' largest companies, entrepreneurs, economics faculty in various Philippine universities, past and present government Secretaries and Undersecretaries, including officials of the National Economic and Development Authority (NEDA), a member of the Commission on Elections, two governors of the Philippine central bank, members of the Philippine Senate and House of Representatives, two Justices of the Supreme Court, a Vice-President of the Philippines, and a President of the Philippines.

The current dean of the School of Economics is Prof. Ma. Joy V. Abrenica, Ph.D.

Notable alumni
 Dante Canlas (Ph.D. 1978): Professor emeritus, UPSE; Secretary for Socioeconomic Planning and NEDA Director-General (2001-2002)
 Conchita Carpio Morales (A.B. 1964): Ombudsman of the Philippines (2011-2018); Associate Justice, Supreme Court (2002-2011)
 Pilar Juliana Cayetano (Pia) (B.S. 1985): Senator (2004-2010; 2010–2016; 2019- )
 Rosalia de Leon (B.A.): Treasurer of the Philippines (2012-2014; 2017- )
 Benjamin Diokno (M.A. 1974): Secretary, Department of Finance (2022- ); Governor, Bangko Sentral ng Pilipinas, (2019-2022); Secretary, Department of Budget and Management (2016-2019; 1998–2001); Undersecretary, Department of Budget and Management (1986-1991); Professor emeritus, UPSE
 Emmanuel F. Esguerra (A.B. 1976; M.A. 1981; PhD 1993): Acting Secretary for Socio-Economic Planning and NEDA Director-General (Feb-June 2016); Deputy-Director General of the National Development Office for Policy and Planning, NEDA (2012-Jan 2016); former faculty, UPSE
 Nestor Espenilla, Jr. (+2019) (B.S.B.E. 1981) Governor, Bangko Sentral ng Pilipinas (2017-2019)
 Raul V. Fabella (M.A. 1975): National Scientist; Academician (NAST); Professor emeritus, UPSE
 Rowena V. Guanzon (B.S. 1979): Member, House of Representatives (2022- ); Commissioner, Commission on Elections, (2015-2022); Commissioner on Audit (2013-2015); Mayor, Cadiz City, Negros Oriental, (1988-1991)
 Marvic Leonen (B.S. 1983): Senior Associate Justice, Supreme Court of the Philippines, (2013- )
 Gloria Macapagal Arroyo (Ph.D. 1985): President of the Republic of the Philippines (2001-2010); Member, House of Representatives (2010-2019; 2022- ) and Speaker (2018-2019)
 Mahar Mangahas (M.A. 1965): President, Social Weather Stations; former faculty, UPSE
Liza Maza (nee Largoza) (B.S.B.E. 1978): women's rights activist; President, Gabriela Women's Party; Member, House of Representatives (2001-2004; 2004–2006; 2007–2010); Convenor, National Anti-Poverty Commission (2016-2018)
 Felipe Medalla (M.A.): Governor, Bangko Sentral ng Pilipinas, (2022- ); Member, Monetary Board, Bangko Sentral ng Pilipinas (2011-2016, 2017-2022); Secretary for Socioeconomic Planning and NEDA Director-General (1998-2001); former vice-president, UP; former faculty and dean, UPSE
 Solita Monsod (nee Collas) (Winnie) (A.B. 1959): Professor emeritus, UPSE; TV host and columnist; Secretary for Socioeconomic Planning and NEDA Director-General (1986-1989)
 Horacio Morales, Jr. (+2012) (A.B. 1965): Secretary of Agrarian Reform (1998-2001); former Executive Vice-President, Development Academy of the Philippines
 Stella Luz Alabastro Quimbo (B.S. 1991, Ph.D. 2000): Member, House of Representatives (2019- ); Commissioner, Philippine Competition Commission (2015-2019); former faculty, UPSE; Congresswoman, Marikina District 2
 Maria Leonor (Leni) Robredo (nee Gerona) (B.S. 1987): 14th Vice President of the Philippines (2016-2022); member, House of Representatives (2013-2016)
Bernadette Romulo-Puyat (B.S. 1990, M.A. 1998): Secretary of Tourism (2018-2022); Deputy Governor, Bangko Sentral ng Pilipinas (2022- ) 
 Maria Lourdes Sereno (M.A. 1992 (attended)): 24th De Facto Chief Justice of the Supreme Court of the Philippines (2012-2018)
 Gerardo P. Sicat (M.A. 1958): Professor emeritus, UPSE; Minister of Economic Planning and Director-General, National Economic and Development Authority (1973-1981)

Images

References

External links

UP School of Economics official website

Economics
Educational institutions established in 1965
1965 establishments in the Philippines